Phytocoris tiliae is a species of plant bugs belonging to the family Miridae, subfamily Mirinae.

Description
It have black coloured mottling on the wings with its underside being silver-grey to lime-green.

Distribution
It is mainly absent from Albania, Azores, Bosnia and Herzegovina,  Canary Islands, Cyprus, Faroe Islands, Iceland, Lithuania,  Madeira, Malta, North Macedonia, and some parts of Russia. then east to the Caucasus.

Ecology
Phytocoris tiliae found on deciduous trees (Tilia, Quercus, Corylus, Populus, Crataegus, Sorbus, Fagus, Malus, Acer, Fraxinus, Salix)  where it feeds on mites and other small insects.

References

External links
Phytocoris tiliae

Insects described in 1777
Hemiptera of Europe
Phytocoris
Taxa named by Johan Christian Fabricius